Geologically one of the youngest inhabited territories on Earth, Easter Island, located in the mid-Pacific Ocean, was, for most of its history, one of the most isolated. Its inhabitants, the Rapa Nui, have endured famines, epidemics of disease ,civil war, environmental collapse, slave raids, various colonial contacts, and have seen their population crash on more than one occasion. The ensuing cultural legacy has brought the island notoriety out of proportion to the number of its inhabitants.

First settlers 

Early European visitors to Easter Island recorded the local oral traditions about the original settlers. In these traditions, Easter Islanders claimed that a chief Hotu Matu'a arrived on the island in one or two large canoes with his wife and extended family. They are believed to have been Polynesian. There is considerable uncertainty about the accuracy of this legend as well as the date of settlement. Some scientists say that Easter Island was not inhabited until 700–800 CE. This date range is based on glottochronological calculations and on three radiocarbon dates from charcoal that appears to have been produced during forest clearance activities. Moreover, a recent study which included radiocarbon dates from what is thought to be very early material suggests that the island was settled as recently as 1200 CE. This seems to be supported by a 2006 study of the island's deforestation, which may have started around the same time. A large now extinct palm, Paschalococos disperta, related to the Chilean wine palm (Jubaea chilensis), was one of the dominant trees as attested by fossil evidence; this species, whose sole occurrence was Easter Island, became extinct due to deforestation by the early settlers.

The Austronesian Polynesians, who first settled the island, are likely to have arrived from the Marquesas Islands from the west. These settlers brought bananas, taro, sugarcane, and paper mulberry, as well as chickens and Polynesian rats. The island at one time supported a relatively advanced and complex civilization.

It is suggested that the reason settlers sought an isolated island was because of high levels of Ciguatera fish poisoning in their then-current surrounding area.

South American links 

The Norwegian botanist and explorer Thor Heyerdahl (and many others) has documented that cultural similarities exist between Easter Island and South American Indian cultures. He has suggested that this most likely came from some settlers arriving from the continent. According to local legends, a group of people called hanau epe (meaning either "long eared" or "stocky" people) came into conflict with another group called the hanau momoko (either "short-eared" or "slim" people). After mutual suspicions erupted in a violent clash, the hanau epe were overthrown and nearly exterminated, leaving only one survivor. Various interpretations of this story have been made – that it represents a struggle between natives and incoming migrants; that it recalls inter-clan warfare; or that represents a class conflict.

Despite these claims, DNA sequence analysis of Easter Island's current inhabitants indicates that the 36 people living on Rapa Nui who survived the devastating internecine wars, slave raids and epidemics of the 19th century and had any offspring, were Polynesian. Furthermore, examination of skeletons offers evidence of only Polynesian origins for Rapa Nui living on the island after 1680.

Pre-European society 

According to legends recorded by the missionaries in the 1860s, the island originally had a very clear class system, with an ariki, king, wielding absolute God-like power ever since Hotu Matua had arrived on the island. The most visible element in the culture was production of massive moai that were part of the ancestral worship. With a strictly unified appearance, moai were erected along most of the coastline, indicating a homogeneous culture and centralized governance. In addition to the royal family, the island's habitation consisted of priests, soldiers and commoners.

The ariki mau, Kai Mako'i 'Iti, along with his grandson Mau Rata, died in the 1860s while serving as an indentured servant in Peru.

For unknown reasons, a coup by military leaders called matatoa had brought a new cult based around a previously unexceptional god, Make-make. In the cult of the birdman (Rapa Nui: tangata manu), a competition was established in which every year a representative of each clan, chosen by the leaders, would swim across shark-infested waters to Motu Nui, a nearby islet, to search for the season's first egg laid by a manutara (sooty tern). The first swimmer to return with an egg and successfully climb back up the cliff to Orongo would be named "Birdman of the year" and secure control over distribution of the island's resources for his clan for the year. The tradition was still in existence at the time of first contact by Europeans but was suppressed by Christian missionaries in the 1860s.

The "statue-toppling" 
European accounts in 1722 (Dutch) and 1770 (Spanish) reported seeing only standing statues, which were still venerated, but by James Cook's visit in 1774 many were reported toppled. The huri mo'ai – the "statue-toppling" – continued into the 1830s. By 1838, the only standing moai were on the slopes of Rano Raraku and Hoa Hakananai'a at Orongo. In about 60 years, islanders had damaged this part of their ancestors' heritage.; theories have ranged from intertribal warfare to loss of faith in their ancestors' ability to protect them. In modern times, moai have been restored at Anakena, Ahu Tongariki, Ahu Akivi and Hanga Roa.

European contacts 

The first-recorded European contact with the island took place on 5 April (Easter Sunday) 1722 when Dutch navigator Jacob Roggeveen  visited for a week and estimated there were 2,000 to 3,000 inhabitants on the island. His party reported "remarkable, tall, stone figures, a good 30 feet in height", the island had rich soil and a good climate and "all the country was under cultivation". Fossil-pollen analysis shows that the main trees on the island had gone 72 years earlier in 1650.

The islanders were fascinated by the Dutch and sailed out to meet them, unarmed. The Dutch officer, Karl Friedrich Barons, wrote of the encounter:

"During the morning [the captain] brought an Easter Islander onboard with his craft. This hapless creature seemed to be very glad to behold us, and he showed the greatest wonder at the build of our ship. He took special notice of the taughtness of our spars, the stoutness of our rigging and running gear, the sails, the guns, which he felt all over with minute attention and with everything else that he saw. When the image of his own features was displayed before him in a mirror, he started suddenly back, and then looked toward the back of the glass, apparently in the expectation of discovering the cause of the apparition. After we had sufficiently beguilded ourselves with him and he with us, we started him off again in his canoe towards the shore".

When the Dutch got to shore, the islanders pressed around them, tried to touch the Dutch, their clothes, and even their guns. During this, a shot rang out from an unknown person, leading to a firefight that killed ten or twelve islanders. To their distress, they learned that among them was the young man who they had shown their ship, to which Barons stated that the crew was "much grieved". The natives soon returned - not for revenge, but seeking to trade food for the bodies of their fallen. The Dutch left shortly thereafter.

The next foreign visitors arrived on 15 November 1770: two Spanish ships, San Lorenzo and Santa Rosalia, sent by the Viceroy of Peru, Manuel de Amat, and commanded by Felipe González de Ahedo. They spent five days on the island, performing a very thorough survey of its coast, and named it Isla de San Carlos, taking possession on behalf of King Charles III of Spain, and ceremoniously erected three wooden crosses on top of three small hills on Poike.

Four years later, in mid-March 1774, British explorer James Cook visited Easter Island.  Cook himself was too sick to walk far, but a small group explored the island. They reported the statues as being neglected with some having fallen down; no sign of the three crosses and his botanist described it as "a poor land". He had a Tahitian interpreter who could partially understand the language. Other than in counting, though, the language was unintelligible. Cook later estimated that there were about 700 people on the island. He saw only three or four canoes, all unseaworthy.  Parts of the island were cultivated with banana, sugarcane, and sweet potatoes, while other parts looked like they had once been cultivated but had fallen into disuse. Georg Forster reported in his account that he saw no trees over ten feet tall on the island. Cook also noted that, unlike before, the islanders carried weapons when approaching foreign visitors - "spears, six or eight feet long, which are pointed at one end with pieces of black flint".

On 10 April 1786 the French explorer Jean François de Galaup La Pérouse visited and made a detailed map of Easter Island. He described the island as one-tenth cultivated and estimated that the population of the island was around two thousand.  As published maps increasingly included the island, by the 19th century it had become a common resupply stop for sealing and whaling ships, with over fifty known visits. Over time, these stops (starting with an 1805 visit from an American sealing ship) increasingly included pressing the islanders into the ships' crews as forced labourers, and - ultimately - outright slave raids.

Destruction of society and population 
A series of devastating events killed almost the entire population of Easter Island. Jared Diamond suggested that Easter Island's society so destroyed their environment that, by around 1600, their society fell into a downward spiral of warfare, cannibalism, and population decline (see Ecocide Theory). Critics contend that society was largely peaceful and booming at the time of western contact and that it only went into a catastrophic decline after the introduction of western diseases and slaving raids (see Criticism of the Ecocide Theory)

In December 1862, Peruvian slave raiders struck Easter Island. Violent abductions continued for several months, eventually capturing or killing around 1500 men and women, about half of the island's population. International protests erupted, escalated by Bishop Florentin-Étienne Jaussen of Tahiti. The slaves were finally freed in autumn 1863, but by then most of them had already died of tuberculosis, smallpox and dysentery. Finally, a dozen islanders managed to return from the horrors of Peru, but brought with them smallpox and started an epidemic, which reduced the island's population to the point where some of the dead were not even buried.

The first Christian missionary, Eugène Eyraud, arrived in January 1864 and spent most of that year on the island; but mass conversion of the Rapa Nui only came after his return in 1866 with Father Hippolyte Roussel.  Two other missionaries arrived with Captain Jean-Baptiste Dutrou-Bornier. Eyraud contracted tuberculosis during the 1867 island epidemic, which took a quarter of the island's remaining population of 1,200, with only 930 Rapanui remaining.  The dead included the last ariki mau, the last East Polynesia royal first-born son, the 13-year-old Manu Rangi. Eyraud died of tuberculosis in August 1868, by which time almost the entire Rapa Nui population had become Roman Catholic.

Dutrou-Bornier 
Jean-Baptiste Dutrou-Bornier – who had served as an artillery officer in the Crimean War, but was later arrested in Peru, accused of arms dealing and sentenced to death, to be released after intervention from the French consul – first came to Easter Island in 1866 when he transported two missionaries there, returned in 1867 to recruit laborers for coconut plantations, and then came again to stay in April 1868, burning the yacht he had arrived in. He was to have a long-lasting impact on the island.

Dutrou-Bornier set up residence at Mataveri, aiming to cleanse the island of most of the Rapa Nui and turn it into a sheep ranch. He married Koreto, a Rapa Nui, and appointed her Queen, tried to persuade France to make the island a protectorate, and recruited a faction of Rapa Nui whom he allowed to abandon their Christianity and revert to their previous faith.  With rifles, a cannon, and hut burning supporters, he ran the island for several years.

Dutrou-Bornier bought up all of the island apart from the missionaries' area around Hanga Roa and moved a couple hundred Rapa Nui to Tahiti to work for his backers. In 1871 the missionaries, having fallen out with Dutrou-Bornier, evacuated 275 Rapa Nui to Mangareva and Tahiti, leaving only 230 on the island. Those who remained were mostly older men. Six years later, there were just 111 people living on Easter Island.

In 1876 Dutrou-Bornier was murdered in an argument over a dress, though his kidnapping of pubescent girls may also have motivated his killers.

Neither his first wife back in France, who was heir under French law, nor his second wife on the island, who briefly installed their daughter Caroline as Queen, were to keep much from his estate. But to this day much of the island is a ranch controlled from off-island and for more than a century real power on the island was usually exercised by resident non-Rapa Nui living at Mataveri. An unusual number of shipwrecks had left the island better supplied with wood than for many generations, whilst legal wrangles over Dutrou-Bornier's land deals were to complicate the island's history for decades to come.

1878–1888 
Alexander Salmon, Jr., was the brother of the Queen of Tahiti, the son of an English merchant adventurer, and a member of the mercantile dynasty that had bankrolled Dutrou-Bornier. He arrived on the island in 1878 with some fellow Tahitians and returning Rapa Nui and ran the island for a decade. As well as producing wool he encouraged the manufacture of Rapa Nui artworks, a trade that thrives to this day. It was this era of peace and recovery that saw the linguistic change from old Rapa Nui to the Tahitian-influenced modern Rapa Nui language, and some changes to the island's myths and culture to accommodate other Polynesian and Christian influences (notably, Ure, the old Rapa Nui word for "penis", was dropped from many people's names).

This era saw archaeological and ethnographic studies, one in 1882 by the Germans on the gunboat , and again in 1886 by the American sloop , whose crew excavated Ahu Vinapu with dynamite.

Father Roussel made a number of pastoral visits in the decade, but the only permanent representatives of the church were Rapa Nui catechists including, from 1884, Angata, one of the Rapa Nui who had left with the missionaries in 1871. Despite the lack of a resident priest to celebrate mass regularly, the Rapa Nui had returned to Roman Catholicism, but there remained some tension between temporal and spiritual power as Father Roussel disapproved of Salmon because of his Jewish paternity.

Annexation to Chile 
On 8 March 1837, under the command of Teniente de Marina Leoncio Señoret, the ship of the Chilean Navy Colo Colo sailed off from Valparaíso bound for Australia. Thus, the Colo Colo was the first Chilean ship to visit the Easter Island.

Easter Island was annexed by Chile on 9 September 1888 by Policarpo Toro, by means of the "Treaty of Annexation of the island" (Tratado de Anexión de la isla). After annexation, Chile forced the natives to wall off Hanga Roa, becoming a walled ghetto where they were forced to live.  The island was handed over to the English sheep-farming company Williamson Balfor, and - no longer being able to farm for food - the natives were forced to work on the ranches in order to buy food.

20th century 

In March 1914, the Routledge Expedition landed and began a 17-month archaeological and ethnographic survey of the island.

In December 1914, another German warship, the commerce raider Prinz Eitel Friedrich, visited and released 48 British and French merchant seamen onto the island, supplying much needed labour for the archaeologists.

Until the 1960s the surviving Rapanui were confined to Hanga Roa. The rest of the island was rented to the Williamson-Balfour Company as a sheep farm until 1953. The island was then managed by the Chilean Navy until 1966, at which point the island was reopened in its entirety. In 1966, the Rapanui were given Chilean citizenship. 

Following the 1973 Chilean coup d'état that brought Augusto Pinochet to power, Easter Island was placed under martial law. Tourism slowed down and private property was "restored". During his time in power, Pinochet visited Easter Island on three occasions. The military built a number of new military facilities and a new city hall.

Pinochet is reported to have refused to attend the opening ceremony in protest against pressures from the United States to address human rights cases.

21st century 
On 30 July 2007, a constitutional reform gave Easter Island and the Juan Fernández Islands (also known as Robinson Crusoe Island) the status of "special territories" of Chile. Pending the enactment of a special charter, the island continued to be governed as a province of the V Region of Valparaíso.

A total solar eclipse visible from Easter Island occurred for the first time in over 1300 years on 11 July 2010, at 18:15:15.

Species of fish were collected in Easter Island for one month in different habitats including shallow lava pools, depths of 43 meters, and deep waters. Within these habitats, two holotypes and paratypes, Antennarius randalli and Antennarius moai, were discovered. These are considered frog-fish because of their characteristics: "12 dorsal rays, last two or three branched; bony part of first dorsal spine slightly shorter than second dorsal spine; body without bold zebra-like markings; caudal peduncle short, but distinct; last pelvic ray divided; pectoral rays 11 or 12".

Indigenous rights movement
Starting in August 2010, members of the indigenous Hitorangi clan occupied the Hangaroa Eco Village and Spa. The occupiers allege that the hotel was bought from the Pinochet government, in violation of a Chilean agreement with the indigenous Rapa Nui, in the 1990s. The occupiers say their ancestors had been cheated into giving up the land. According to a BBC report, on 3 December 2010, at least 25 people were injured when Chilean police using pellet guns attempted to evict from these buildings a group of Rapa Nui who had claimed that the land the buildings stood on had been illegally taken from their ancestors.

In January 2011, the UN's Special Rapporteur on Indigenous People, James Anaya, expressed concern about the treatment of the indigenous Rapa Nui by the Chilean government, urging Chile to "make every effort to conduct a dialogue in good faith with representatives of the Rapa Nui people to solve, as soon as possible the real underlying problems that explain the current situation".

The incident ended in February 2011, when up to 50 armed police broke into the hotel to remove the final five occupiers. They were arrested by the government and no injuries were reported.
Since being given Chilean citizenship in 1966, the Rapa Nui have re-embraced their ancient culture, or what could be reconstructed of it.

Mataveri International Airport is the island's only airport. In the 1980s, its runway was lengthened by the U.S. space program to 3,318 m (10,885 ft) so that it could serve as an emergency landing site for the Space Shuttle. This enabled regular wide body jet services and a consequent increase of tourism on the island, coupled with migration of people from mainland Chile which threatens to alter the Polynesian identity of the island. Land disputes have created political tensions since the 1980s, with part of the native Rapa Nui opposed to private property and in favor of traditional communal property.

On 26 March 2015, local minority group Rapa Nui Parliament took control over large parts of the island, throwing out the CONAF park rangers in a non-violent revolution. Their main goal is to obtain independence from Chile. The situation has not yet been resolved.

Archaeology 
The pits contained red ochre consisting of the iron oxides hematite and maghemite and were covered with a lid.

”This indicates, that even though the palm vegetation had disappeared, the prehistoric population of Easter Island continued the pigment production, and on a substantial scale" said archaeobotanist Welmoed Out from Moesgaard Museum.

References

External links

 
 Easter Island – The Statues and Rock Art of Rapa Nui – Bradshaw Foundation / Dr Georgia Lee
 Chile Cultural Society – Easter Island
 Rapa Nui Digital Media Archive – Creative Commons – licensed photos, laser scans, panoramas, focused in the area around Rano Raraku and Ahu Te Pito Kura with data from an Autodesk/CyArk research partnership
 Mystery of Easter Island – PBS Nova program
 Description of island and discussion of dating controversies
 
 "From Genocide to Ecocide: the Rape of Rapa Nui " — Benny Peiser. Energy & Environment 16, no. 3/4 (2005): 513–39. Accessed March 8, 2021.

 
Prehistory of Oceania
1722 in the Dutch Empire
Maritime history of the Dutch Republic